This is an index of religious honorifics from various religions.

Buddhism

Christianity

Eastern Orthodox

The Church of Jesus Christ of Latter-day Saints

Protestantism

Catholicism

Hinduism

Islam

Judaism

Neopaganism

Raëlism

Scientology

Serer

Zoroastrianism

See also
 List of religious topics
 List of education topics

References 

 Honorifics and titles
 Religious honorifics and titles

Titles and styles
Religious titles and styles